The Braksøya Formation is a geologic formation in the Ringerike and Modum areas in Buskerud, Norway, where it overlies the Bruflat Formation and the Skien and Holmestrand areas where it overlies the Porsgrunn Formation and Skinnerbukta Formation respectively. The formation, deposited in a shallow Caledonian foreland basin at the edge of a closing Iapetus Ocean, preserves fossils dating back to the Sheinwoodian stage of the Silurian period.

Fossil content 

The stromatoporoid bioherms of the Braksøya Formation have provided fossils of:
 Stromatoporida
 Syringostromellidae
 Syringostromella cf. aspectabilis
 Actinostromatida
 Actinostromatidae
 Plectostroma norvegicum
 Clathrodictyida
 Clathrodictyidae
 Clathrodictyon cf. crickmayi

See also 
 List of fossiliferous stratigraphic units in Norway
 Buildwas Formation, Sheinwoodian type formation in England
 Llallagua Formation, Sheinwoodian fossiliferous formation in Bolivia

References

Bibliography 
 
 

Geologic formations of Norway
Silurian System of Europe
Silurian Norway
Sheinwoodian
Limestone formations
Reef deposits
Silurian southern paleotropical deposits
Paleontology in Norway
Formations